Colorado Golf Club is a golf club located in Parker, Colorado, southeast of Denver. Opened in 2007, it hosted the Senior PGA Championship in 2010, won by Tom Lehman. It also hosted the Solheim Cup in 2013, a biennial ladies team competition contested by teams from the United States and Europe.

References

External links

Golf clubs and courses in Colorado
Solheim Cup venues
Sports venues in Denver
Buildings and structures in Douglas County, Colorado
Parker, Colorado